The Hound of the Baskervilles is a 1959 British gothic mystery film directed by Terence Fisher and produced by Hammer Film Productions. It is based on the 1902 novel of the same title by Sir Arthur Conan Doyle. It stars Peter Cushing as Sherlock Holmes, Sir Christopher Lee as Sir Henry Baskerville and André Morell as Doctor Watson. It is the first film adaptation of the novel to be filmed in colour.

Plot
In London, Dr. Richard Mortimer asks Sherlock Holmes and Doctor Watson to investigate the death of his friend Sir Charles Baskerville, in Dartmoor, found dead by heart failure, lying in the moor surrounding his estate, Baskerville Hall. Mortimer believes that his good friend had been scared to death by the vision of a ghost hound, the same that centuries before killed Sir Charles' ancestor, the devilish Sir Hugo, and relates the story of the "curse of the Baskervilles", portrayed in a flashback scene. Mortimer tells Holmes that he also fears for the life of Sir Henry Baskerville, Sir Charles' nephew and heir, who's just come from Johannesburg, South Africa to take possession of his inheritance and of Baskerville Hall.

Although sceptical, Holmes and Watson agree to meet the young Sir Henry who complains to them that one of his boots is missing. Mortimer, upon arriving, tells them that the Baskerville estate is worth about £1,000,000. A series of peculiar incidents, including a threat from a dangerous tarantula, soon convinces Holmes that Sir Henry's life is indeed in danger. Claiming that he cannot come to Baskerville Hall himself due to a prior commitment, Holmes dispatches Watson to Dartmoor with Mortimer and Sir Henry. Before parting, Holmes reminds Watson not to let Sir Henry go out onto the nearby moor after dark.

On their way to Baskerville Hall, the trio is warned by the coach driver Perkins that a convicted murderer named Selden has escaped from nearby Dartmoor Prison and is hiding on the moor. At Baskerville Hall, Sir Henry is shown around the mansion by Mr. Barrymore, the butler, and Mrs. Barrymore, the housekeeper. When Sir Henry notices that one of two portraits of his infamous ancestor Sir Hugo is missing, the Barrymores are unable to offer any explanation. All they know is that it was mysteriously stolen several months ago. Sir Charles even called in the police from Exeter but they could find no trace of the picture.

The next day, Sir Henry and Watson meet the friendly local pastor, Bishop Frankland, who is also a keen entomologist. The bishop wanted to ask Sir Henry if he can donate something for a jumble sale in the nearby village. While crossing the moor after visiting the post office in the village, Watson gets lost in a wetland called Grimpen Mire and gets trapped in a patch of quicksand. Two people come to help, a farmer named Stapleton and his daughter Cecile, a beautiful and wild girl who immediately bewitches Sir Henry.

One night, Watson sees a light in the moor. He and Sir Henry go out to investigate, but a strange man rushes by in the shadows, then a distant hound howls, upsetting Sir Henry so much that he faints. Watson spots a figure silhouetted on a hill in the distance while he helps Sir Henry back to Baskerville Hall. Soon, Watson discovers that the silhouetted figure was Holmes, who has concealed his own arrival in order to investigate more freely.

Together, Holmes and Watson find the corpse of the convict Selden, wearing Sir Henry's clothes, slaughtered by an unknown beast. The clothing exposes the Barrymores, who confess to have helped the escapee, who was their relative, by supplying food and other provisions each time he signaled with a light from his hideout. However, Holmes has evidence relating to the poisonous spider and the missing portrait of Sir Hugo, that convinces him that neither the Barrymores nor Selden are connected to the death of Sir Charles. He also figures that the tarantula that was found in London was the same one which was stolen from Bishop Frankland. Holmes pays Frankland a visit, who is a bit of a Peeping Tom with his telescope.

After surviving personal danger in an abandoned tin mine while looking for evidence of a hound, Holmes is able to guess who unleashed the hound in pursuit of Sir Charles and why they did it. Believing that a trap has been set for Sir Henry, the detective and his assistant accompany him to the moor where Sir Henry had met Cecile. When Sir Henry meets Cecile this time, though, she rejects him, finally revealing that she and her father are also descendants of Sir Hugo Baskerville, planning to claim the inheritance as their own once Sir Henry is out of the way. The hound appears and attacks Sir Henry. Holmes hesitates to shoot it for nearly thirty seconds to allow it to sufficiently maul Sir Henry. Stapleton attempts to attack Watson with the legendary curved dagger used by Sir Hugo, but Watson shoots and wounds him. After being shot, the hound runs past Stapleton. Stapleton reaches out and grabs the hound so that the hound can maul him to death. Cecile flees. Sir Henry appears unscathed from the mauling. After Holmes kills the beast, he reveals it to be a Great Dane wearing a hideous mask to make it look more terrifying. Cecile tries to escape across the moor, only to fall into the Grimpen Mire where she sinks to her death in the mud. The three men observe this while returning to the Hall and concur that the curse has claimed its final victim. Sir Henry can now claim his inheritance in peace, and Holmes and Watson return to London along with the stolen portrait of Sir Hugo that was found on the Stapleton farm. The picture revealed that Sir Hugo’s right hand fingers were webbed which was a trait that Stapleton himself inherited.

Cast

 Peter Cushing as Sherlock Holmes
 André Morell as Doctor Watson
 Christopher Lee as Sir Henry Baskerville
 Marla Landi as Cecile Stapleton
 David Oxley as Sir Hugo Baskerville
 Francis de Wolff as Doctor Richard Mortimer
 Miles Malleson as Bishop Frankland
 Ewen Solon as Stapleton
 John Le Mesurier as Barrymore
 Helen Goss as Mrs. Barrymore
 Sam Kydd as Perkins
 Michael Hawkins as Lord Caphill
 Judi Moyens as Servant Girl
 Michael Mulcaster as Selden
 David Birks as Servant

Production

Casting
Cushing was an aficionado of Sherlock Holmes and brought his knowledge to the project. He re-read the stories, made detailed notes in his script and sought to portray Holmes closer to his literary counterpart. It was Cushing's suggestion that the mantelpiece feature Holmes's correspondence transfixed to it with a jackknife as per the original stories.

Locations
Filming took place on location at Chobham Common and Frensham Ponds, both in Surrey.

Critical reception
Peter Cushing's Holmes received good reviews at the time, with Films and Filming calling him an "impish, waspish, Wilde-ian Holmes", while the New York Herald Tribune stated "Peter Cushing is a forceful and eager Sherlock Holmes". André Morell's Watson has been praised for his far more accurate rendition of the character as envisioned by Arthur Conan Doyle, as opposed to the comical buffoon created by Nigel Bruce.

A negative review in the Monthly Film Bulletin stated that "any freshly entertaining possibilities in this much-filmed story have here been lost in a welter of blood, love interest and mood music". The review also noted unimaginative staging and direction and "dull performances".

Time Out (London) called it "the best Sherlock Holmes film ever made, and one of Hammer's finest movies". On Rotten Tomatoes it has a 94% approval rating based on reviews from 18 critics.

Box Office
According to Kinematograph Weekly the film performed "better than average" at the British box office in 1959.

References

Sources

External links
 
 
 
 
 

Films based on The Hound of the Baskervilles
1959 films
1950s mystery films
1959 horror films
British mystery films
Hammer Film Productions horror films
British detective films
Films directed by Terence Fisher
Films scored by James Bernard
Gothic horror films
Sherlock Holmes films
1950s English-language films
1950s British films